Fusitriton laudandus is a species of predatory sea snail, a marine gastropod mollusk in the family Cymatiidae.

Description

Distribution

References

Cymatiidae